The following is the list of squads for each of the 16 teams competing in the FIBA EuroBasket 2001, held in Turkey between 31 August and 9 September 2001. Each team selected a squad of 12 players for the tournament.

Group A

France

Israel

Lithuania

Ukraine

Group B

Latvia

Slovenia

Spain

Turkey

Group C

Croatia

Estonia

Germany

FR Yugoslavia

Group D

Bosnia and Herzegovina

Greece

Italy

Russia

References
 2001 European Championship for Men, FIBA.com.
 European Championship 2001 - National Squads, LinguaSport.com.

2001